Bouse (  rhymes with "house") is a census-designated place (CDP) and ghost town in La Paz County, Arizona, United States. Founded in 1908 as a mining camp, the economy of Bouse is now based on tourism, agriculture, and retirees. The population was 996 at the 2010 census. It was originally named Brayton after the store owner John Brayton Martin.

Geography
Bouse is located north of the center of La Paz County at  (33.933657, -114.008268). Arizona State Route 72 passes through the community, leading northwest  to Parker and southeast  to Hope.

Although the buildings are gone, a few foundations remain, as do some of the tank tracks from World War II. There is a Camp Bouse memorial monument in Bouse.

Demographics

Bouse first appeared on the 1920 U.S. Census as an unincorporated village, then in Yuma County. Although it did not appear separately as a village in 1930, the precinct it was located in, Bouse Precinct, had been contiguous with the village in 1920, and it reported a population of 427, which was majority White. Bouse's population was estimated as 100 in 1940, and also 100 in the 1960 census.  It appeared again in 2000, when it was made a census-designated place (CDP), now within La Paz County.

As of the census of 2010, there were 996 people, 547 households, and 303 families residing in the CDP. The racial makeup of the CDP was 95.6% White, 0.3% Black or African American, 1.3% Native American, 0.2% Asian, 0.3% Pacific Islander, 0.8% from other races, and 1.5% from two or more races. Hispanic or Latino of any race were 4.6% of the population.

There were 320 households, out of which 6.9% had children under the age of 18 living with them, 57.5% were married couples living together, 5.0% had a female householder with no husband present, and 35.3% were non-families. 30.3% of all households were made up of individuals, and 22.2% had someone living alone who was 65 years of age or older.  The average household size was 1.92 and the average family size was 2.33.

In the CDP, the population was spread out, with 9.8% under the age of 18, 1.1% from 18 to 24, 8.5% from 25 to 44, 29.3% from 45 to 64, and 51.4% who were 65 years of age or older.  The median age was 65 years. For every 100 females, there were 97.1 males.  For every 100 females age 18 and over, there were 96.1 males.

The median income for a household in the CDP was $19,479, and the median income for a family was $27,935. Males had a median income of $36,250 versus $20,536 for females. The per capita income for the CDP was $13,623.  About 9.9% of families and 21.0% of the population were below the poverty line, including 47.4% of those under age 18 and 12.3% of those age 65 or over.

Climate
This area has a large amount of sunshine year round due to its stable descending air and high pressure.  According to the Köppen Climate Classification system, Bouse has a desert climate, abbreviated "Bwh" on climate maps.

Government
The Bouse Domestic Water Improvement District provides water service to Bouse.

Economy
An egg facility owned by Rose Acre Farms broke ground near Bouse on July 13, 2015. The facility was also planned to include a pullet farm, a rail spur from the Arizona and California Railroad, and a feed mill operation. According to the president of the La Paz Economic Development Corporation, it is the biggest economic development project ever taken in the county. In early 2017, it was reported by the mayor of Parker that the facility has hens and its first truckload of eggs was out.

See also

 List of census-designated places in Arizona
 List of historic properties in Bouse, Arizona

References

Further reading

External links

 Bouse Chamber of Commerce
 Bouse information and attractions 
 Minerals of Bouse at Mindat.org

Census-designated places in La Paz County, Arizona
Populated places in the Sonoran Desert
Populated places established in 1908
1908 establishments in Arizona Territory
Ghost towns in Arizona